Mohammed Al-Hammadi may refer to:

Mohammed Al-Hammadi (footballer, born 1995)
Mohammed Al-Hammadi (footballer, born 1997)
Mohamed Hammadi (born 1995), UAE Paralympic athlete
Mohamed Alhammadi (athlete) (born 1991), UAE Olympic runner
Mohammed Ali Hammadi (born 1964), person on FBI's Most Wanted Terrorists list